Aset Armanūly Irgaliyev (Äset Armanūly Erğaliev; born 18 June 1986) - The Chairman of the Agency for Strategic Planning and Reforms of Kazakhstan.

Biography

Early life and education 
Irgaliyev was born on 18 June 1986 in the city of Kostanay. He is married and has two children.

In 2008 Irgaliyev graduated from KIMEP University with a bachelor's degree in Economics of Public Policy. In the same year, under the international exchange program, he graduated from the Jönköping International Business School in Sweden with a bachelor's degree in Science in International Economics. In 2009, he obtained a master's degree of Science in Economics from University of York in England. In 2010, Irgaliyev graduated from the University of Nottingham, UK, with a master's degree in Philosophy of Economics.
Aset was awarded the medal «Eren Enbegi Ushin».

Career 
 From September 2010 to January 2013 - Aset served as a Regional Analyst for Eastern Europe and the Caucasus at the Economic Department of the European Bank for Reconstruction and Development in London, UK.
 From January 2013 to June 2016 - Vice President, Deputy Chairman of the Management Board, First Deputy Chairman of the Management Board, Chairman of the Board of the «Economic Research Institute» JSC of the Ministry of National Economy of the Republic of Kazakhstan.
 From October to December 2016 - Advisor to the Chairman of the Management Board of JSC «NMH Baiterek».
 From December 2016 to August 2017 - Advisor to the Prime Minister of the Republic of Kazakhstan.
 From August 2017 to September 2018 - Head of the Project Management Center of the Office of the Prime Minister of the Republic of Kazakhstan.
 From September 2018 to March 2019 - Vice Minister of National Economy of the Republic of Kazakhstan.
 From March to August 2019 - Deputy Head of the Office of the Prime Minister of the Republic of Kazakhstan.
 From August 2019 to January 2021 - The First Vice Minister of the National Economy of the Republic of Kazakhstan.
 From January 2021 to January 2022 - Minister of National Economy of the Republic of Kazakhstan.
 From January 6, 2022 - till now - The Chairman of the Agency for Strategic Planning and Reforms of Kazakhstan.

Honours

References 

1986 births
Living people
People from Kostanay
York University alumni
Government ministers of Kazakhstan